Michael Anhaeuser (born August 13, 1969 in Fort Wayne, Indiana) is a former American soccer player and coach. He has spent his entire professional playing career with the Charleston Battery, playing five seasons for the club as a midfielder before moving into the coaching staff.

Club career
Anhaeuser grew up in Fort Wayne, Indiana and attended Indiana University where he played on the men's soccer team under Jerry Yeagley from 1988 to 1991.  The Hoosiers won the 1988 NCAA Men's Soccer Championship in his freshman season.

Following his college career Anhaeuser trialed in Germany with Bundesliga clubs Schalke 04 and VfL Bochum and played in their reserve teams. In 1994, he signed a professional contract with the Charleston Battery of the USISL. He spent five seasons a midfielder with the Battery, making over 100 appearances and winning the 1996 league championship while also working a day job in research and development for the club's corporate parent Blackbaud. Anhaeuser tore his anterior cruciate ligament during the 1999 pre-season and retired from playing professionally.

Coaching career
Anhaeuser spent much of his playing career coaching Lowcountry junior clubs and to this day continues to handle teams in the Battery's youth system. After retiring from playing in 1999, he moved into an assistant coaching role with the Battery under managers Alan Dicks and Chris Ramsey. After the departure of Ramsey in 2005, he was elevated to the position of head coach. 

In 2006, he was named the USL-1 Coach of the Year after he took the Battery to the post-season semifinals and the third round of the U.S. Open Cup. Anhaeuser has led the Battery to league championships in 2010 and 2012 and was the coach of the 2008 Battery team that remains the most recent non-MLS side to reach the final of the Open Cup.

In 2008, he was also given the title of general manager of the Battery, overseeing all soccer operations at the club. Following the 2013 season, Anhaeuser was inducted to the USL Hall of Fame.

After 17 years as head coach of the Charleston Battery, Anhaeuser and the club parted ways on November 1, 2021.

Honors

Player

Charleston Battery
 USISL Professional League: 1996

Manager

Charleston Battery
 USL Second Division: 2010
 USL Pro: 2012

References

External links
Michael Anhaeuser's bio at Charleston Battery

1969 births
Living people
American soccer coaches
American soccer players
Charleston Battery players
Association football midfielders
Indiana Hoosiers men's soccer players
Sportspeople from Fort Wayne, Indiana
Soccer players from Indiana
USISL players
A-League (1995–2004) players
USL Second Division players
USL First Division coaches
Charleston Battery coaches